Monika Kochanová (born 16 February 1989) is a former professional tennis player from Slovakia. On 1 December 2008, she reached her highest WTA singles ranking of 482.

Tennis career
She won three doubles titles on the ITF Women's Circuit. Her only WTA Tour main-draw appearance came at the Budapest Grand Prix where she partnered Dia Evtimova in the doubles event. They lost in the quarterfinals to Alizé Cornet and Janette Husárová.

She decided to follow the college route and was part of the Clemson University tennis team from 2010 to 2012.On 2013 to 2015, playing for the West Florida Argonauts. Since 2016 West Florida Argonauts working as Graduate Assistant Coach.

References

External links
 
 

1989 births
Living people
Tennis players from Bratislava
Slovak female tennis players
Clemson Tigers women's tennis players
West Florida Argonauts athletes
Slovak expatriate sportspeople in the United States